The International Olympiad "Tuymaada" is an annual competition for students under the age of 18, held in the Sakha Republic, Russia. The contestants compete individually, in four independent sections: computer science, mathematics, physics and chemistry. The participating teams (national and local teams) can have up to three students for one section (the total number of students that can participate for a team being twelve, plus two teachers: a leader and a deputy leader). The contest is held in July, for two days of competitions. The structure is being in conformity with the International Science Olympiads worldwide and all Russian National Science Olympiads.

History of the Olympiad
In 1993, the Ministry of Education decided to open a summer school where pupils who showed good results on various maths, physics and computing Olympiads were invited to. The leading teachers of the republic taught classes and there was a summer Olympiad held. In that historically important year the team of the Buryatia republic was invited. In 1994, already it was decided to hold the first international Olympiad of schoolchildren. The summer school for gifted children was later named the International Summer School "Tuymaada" and played a special role in bringing to life the presidential program "Gifted Children". The school gave a perfect opportunity for kids personal development. Holding an international Olympiad "Tuymaada" became the main tradition of the School. Pavlova E.N., head of the department of the Ministry of Education, has been in charge of the Olympiad and a principal of the school for all these years.

The organizers

The organizers of the Olympiads and the initiators of foundation of specialized classes in the Republic were such famous professors, as M.A. Alekseev, S.G. Dyrachov, V.N. Sophroneev, I.E. Serguchev, I.M. Yakoylev and others. The progress of gifted pupils would have been impossible without the great work of staff of Verchneviluysk physics and maths school: V. Dolgunov, N. Ivanov, A. Semenov, A. Machasynov. The names of other teachers are also very famous, such as M. Shergin, O. Sukneva, V. Ratchin, G. Isaev, P. Timopheev, J. Nogovichyna, L. Semenov, R. Mustakimov, T. Demidko, E. Kozlova, M. Sleptsova, Z. Chetvertakova, S. Egorova, and others. 
It is necessary to outline the work of staff of physics and maths school (at present known as the Republican college), founded in 1977. With the help of Aliev I., first principal, candidate of sciences, senior lecturer at Yakut State University, his enthusiasm and self-devotion, school has become the leading institution, that works with gifted children.
Other important names that should be mentioned: A.M. Abramov, Doctor of Sciences, member-journalist of the Russian Academy of Education, Moscow; T.T. Timopheev, candidate of sciences, Novosibirsk; I.F. Sharygin, doctor of sciences, professor of Moscow State University; D.G. Von-Der Flaas, candidate of sciences, member of the all-Russian Olympiads jury and many other Russian scientists and professors.

Early developments
Nowadays the Olympiads are held on various subjects, the special attention is paid to the use of new informational technologies. The coordination of distant intellectual studies is carried out by Popov S.V., professor of Yakut State University, doctor of sciences and by Potapov V.F., the honoured teacher of the Russian Federation. The achievements and success of children shows that the direction chosen the right direction and approach of work. According to the opinion of independent experts, the level of tasks of the Olympiad satisfy the standards of All-Russian and International Olympiads.

See also 
 International Science Olympiad
 ACM International Collegiate Programming Contest
 Central European Olympiad in Informatics

References

External links 
 http://www.guas.info/competit/tuyme.htm
 http://www.wcpsd.org/posters/education/Grigoriev.pdf
 http://www.mathlinks.ro

Competitions in Russia
Science competitions
Science events in Russia
Annual events in Russia